Salvazaon is a genus of longhorn beetles of the subfamily Lamiinae, containing the following species:

subgenus Pseudophlyarus
 Salvazaon curticornis (Pic, 1939)

subgenus Salvazaon
 Salvazaon breve Pic, 1940
 Salvazaon metallicum Pic, 1928
 Salvazaon saginatum Holzschuh, 1999

References

Desmiphorini